Jeremiah Denis Mathias Ford (1873–1958) was an American educator and author. He was the Smith Professor Emeritus of the French and Spanish Languages and Literature at Harvard University from 1907 to 1943. He was the youngest-ever to be appointed a professor at Harvard, the first Catholic faculty, and the last ever appointed as Chairman of the Department of Romance Languages from 1911 to 1943.

Biography

Ford was born 2 July 1873, in Cambridge, Massachusetts. He graduated from Thorndike Grammar School, Cambridge, Massachusetts, in 1886. From 1886 to 1887, he attended the North Monastery Christian Brothers School in Cork, Ireland. 

He then attended the Science and Art Department in South Kensington, London, England, from 1887 to 1888. In 1988, he was awarded Distinction in Chemistry and Math in the Science and Art Department Examinations. 

He was awarded First Scholar & Gold Medal in English in the Junior Grade, in 1888, and the Silver Medal for German, in 1889, from the Intermediate Education Board, Dublin, Ireland. 

He attended Harvard Law School from 1891 to 1892, attaining honors his first year. He then transferred, and attended Harvard College, receiving an A.B., Phi Beta Kappa, summa cum laude, in 1894; A.M., in 1895; and Ph.D, in Romance Philology, in 1897.

Ford was the first Catholic ever hired by Harvard University, he was appointed Instructor in French and Italian in 1895, Harvard Harris Fellow in Romance Philology, Instructor-in-Residence to l'Universitê de Paris, from 1897 to 1898, Instructor in French and Spanish in 1898, Instructor in Romance Languages, in 1899, and Assistant Professor of Romance Languages at Harvard University. 

Then, the youngest professor ever at Harvard, he was appointed Smith Professor of the French & Spanish Languages & Literature at Harvard, in 1907, a chair that had been vacant since 1886. He held that Chair until his retirement in 1943, when he became Smith Professor Emeritus.

Notable student's of Fords included Chandler Rathfon Post.

On January 1, 1902, he married Anna Winifred Fearns, in Cambridge, Massachusetts. They had four children. He died at his home in Cambridge on November 13, 1958.

Languages

Courses taught at Harvard

Honorary degrees
 Docteur-ès-Lettres from the Université Toulouse, France, on 21 Mar 1922.
 Doctor of Letters from the National University of Ireland, Dublin, Ireland, on 28 Oct 1932.
 Degree of Doctor of Letters from Trinity College, Dublin, Ireland, on 05 Jul 1934.
 Doctor of Letters from Bowdoin University, Brunswick, Maine, in 1935.
 Doctor of Humane Letters from Fordham University, New York, in 1940.
 Doctor of Letters from Harvard University, Massachusetts, on 11 Jun 1942.

Medals awarded

Founder
 Catholic Club of Harvard University, in May 1893.
 Medieval Academy of America, in 1925.
 Harvard Council on Hispano-American Studies, in 1929.

President
 Dante Society of America, Massachusetts, from 1927 to 1940.
 Italian Historical Society of Massachusetts, from 1930 to 1940.
 American Academy of Arts & Sciences, from 1931 to 1933.
 The Cambridge Club, Cambridge, Massachusetts, in 1933.  Membership is limited to 100.
 American Catholic Historical Association, in 1935.
 Medieval Academy of America, from 1939 to 1942.
 Humanities Research Association of England, in 1937.

Vice-President
 Modern Language Association of America, from 1910 to 1911.
 Hispanic Society of America, in 1917.
 Modern Language Association of America, from 1927 to 1928.
 American Academy of Arts & Sciences, from 1930 to 1931.
 Hispanic Society of America, from 1937.

Elected
 Corresponding Member of Hispanic Society of America in 1907.
 Correspondiente de la Real Academia Española, in 1911.
 Cambridge School Board member in Cambridge, Massachusetts from 1915 to 1916.
 Correspondiente de la Real Academia de Buenas Letras de Barcelona, Spain, in 1913.
 Fellow of the American Academy of Arts & Sciences, before 1919.
 Fellow of the Medieval Academy of America, in 1927.
 Membre Correspondant de l'Académie des Inscriptions et Belles-Lettres de l'Institut de France, in 1944.

Memberships

Other
 Italian & Spanish Editor of the New International Encyclopedia, from 1901 to 1904.
 Chief Examiner in Spanish for the College Entrance Examination Board, from 1908 to 1921.
 In charge of Spanish & French acquisitions for Harvard University, after 1916.
 First Editor-in-Chief of Speculum, the journal of the Medieval Academy of America, from 1927 to 1936.
 Editor-in-Chief of the Henry Holt & Co. Spanish Series.
 Consulting editor of Hispania, the official journal of the American Association of Teachers of Spanish & Portuguese.

Bibliography
This is a select list of publications by Ford.

1899

 Un Curioso Accidente, Comedia In Tre Acti, di Carlo Goldoni, edited with introductions & notes by J.D.M. Ford. Boston: Heath's Modern Language Series, 1899. 29 editions.
 Exercises in Spanish Composition for First and Second Year Courses, J.D.M. Ford. Boston: Heath's Modern Language Series, 1899, reprinted 1905, 1908.
 El Sí de las Niňas; Comedia en Tres Actos y en Prosa por Leandro Fernández de Moratín, edited with introductions and notes by J.D.M.Ford. Boston: International Modern Language Series 1899, reprinted Boston: Ginn & Co.,1916. 194 editions.
 “Luis de León, the Spanish Poet, Humanist and Mystic,” by J.D.M. Ford. Publications of the Modern Language Association. XIV: 2 (1899), pp. 267–278. 
 “Sedere, Essere, and Stare in the Poema del Cid”, by J.D.M. Ford. Modern Language Notes XIV: 2 (1899), pp. 1–9.

1900

 The Old Spanish Sibilants, by J.D.M. Ford. Harvard Studies and Notes in Philology and Literature VII. Boston: Ginn & Co., 1900. 2 editions.
 “Uberti, Fazio,” by J.D.M. Ford. The Universal Cyclopaedia. II: 17. New York: D. Appleton & Co., 1900.
 “Ulloa y Pereira,” by J.D.M. Ford. The Universal Cyclopaedia. II: 20. New York: D. Appleton & Co., 1900.
 “Valdivierso or Valdivielso, José de,” by J.D.M. Ford. The Universal Cyclopaedia. II: 104. New York: D. Appleton & Co., 1900.
 “Vallanccy, Charles,” by J.D.M. Ford. The Universal Cyclopaedia. II: 108. New York: D. Appleton & Co., 1900.
 “Varchi, Benedetto,” by J.D.M. Ford. The Universal Cyclopaedia. II: 122. New York: D. Appleton & Co., 1900.
 “Venturi, Luigi,” by J.D.M. Ford. The Universal Cyclopaedia. II: 154. New York: D. Appleton & Co., 1900.
 “Villalobos, Francisco Lopez, Joaquin Lorenzo” by J.D.M. Ford. The Universal Cyclopaedia. XII: 200. New York: D. Appleton & Co., 1900.
 “Villanueva, Joaquin Lorenzo” by J.D.M. Ford. The Universal Cyclopaedia. XII: 200. New York:D. Appleton & Co., 1900.
 “Villegas, Esteran Manuel de” by J.D.M. Ford. The Universal Cyclopaedia. XII: 201. New York: D. Appleton & Co., 1900.
 “Villena Don Enrique de Aragón” by J.D.M. Ford. The Universal Cyclopaedia. XII: 202. New York: D. Appleton & Co., 1900.
 “Wolf, Ferdinand” by J.D.M. Ford. The Universal Cyclopaedia. XII: 496. New York: D. Appleton & Co., 1900.

1900–1909

 A Spanish Anthology: A Collection of Lyrics from the Thirteenth Century down to the Present Time; edited with introductions and notes by J.D.M. Ford. New York: Silver Series of Modern Language Text-books, 1901, 4 editions.
 "English Influence upon Spanish Literature in the Early Part of the Nineteenth Century,” by J.D.M. Ford.  P.M.L.A. XVI (1901), pp. 453–459.
 “Cuban Literature” by J.D.M.Ford. The New International Encyclopedia. 1902.
 “Italian Literature” by J.D.M.Ford. The New International Encyclopedia. 1902.
 “Leopardi” by J.D.M. Ford. The New International Encyclopedia. 1902.
 “Portuguese Literature” by J.D.M.Ford. The New International Encyclopedia. 1902.
 “Petrarch” by J.D.M. Ford. The New International Encyclopedia. 1902.
 “Spanish Literature” by J.D.M.Ford. The New International Encyclopedia.1902.
 Review of R. Menendez Pidal, La Legenda del Abad Don Juan de Montemayor, by J.D.M. Ford, Dresden: Gesellschaft fur Romantische Literatus, BandII, 1903.
 “Old Spanish Etymologies,” by J.D.M. Ford. Modern Philology I: 1, (June 1903), p. 49-55.
 The Romances of Chivalry in Italian Verse, by J.D.M. Ford and Mary Agnes Teresa Ford. New York: Henry Holt & Co., 1904, 1906, 1908.
 A Spanish Grammar, by E.C. Hills and J.D.M. Ford. Boston: Heath's Modern Language Series, 1904.
 “To Bite the Dust and Symbolical Lay Communion,” by J.D.M. Ford. Publications of the Modern Language Association. XX (XIII), 2, (1905), 197-230.
 Old Spanish Readings, Selected on the Basis of Critically Edited Texts, by J.D.M. Ford. Boston: International Modern Language Series, 1906.
 “Italian Language,” by J.D.M. Ford. The New International Encyclopedia, Vol. 11: 16-18. New York: Dodd, Mead & Co, 1906.
 “Italian Literature,” by J.D.M. Ford. The New International Encyclopedia, Vol. 11: 18-27. New York: Dodd, Mead & Co, 1906.
 Selections from Don Quijote by Miguel de Cervantes Saaverda, J.D.M. Ford, ed. Boston: D.C. Heath & Co. 1908. 1125 Editions.
 "Caldas-Barbosa, Domingos,” by J.D.M. Ford. The Catholic Encyclopedia, Vol. 3:155-6. New York: Robert Appleton Co., 1908.
 "Calderon de la Barca, Pedro,” by J.D.M. Ford. The Catholic Encyclopedia, Vol. 3:156-7. New York: Robert Appleton Co., 1908.
 "Camões, Luis Vaz de,” by J.D.M. Ford. The Catholic Encyclopedia, Vol. 3:218-20. New York: Robert Appleton Co., 1908.
 "Capponi, Gino, Count” by J.D.M. Ford. The Catholic Encyclopedia, Vol. 3:312. New York: Robert Appleton Co., 1908.
 "Cervantes, Saavedra Miguel de,” by J.D.M. Ford. The Catholic Encyclopedia, Vol. 3:543-45. New York: Robert Appleton Co., 1908.
 "Ferreira, Antonio,” by J.D.M. Ford. The Catholic Encyclopedia, Vol. 6: 49. New York: Robert Appleton Co., 1909.
 “Folengo, Teofilo,” by J.D.M. Ford. The Catholic Encyclopedia, Vol. 6:124. New York: Robert Appleton Co., 1909.
 “Gallego, Juan Nicasio,” by J.D.M. Ford. The Catholic Encyclopedia, Vol. 6:350. New York: Robert Appleton Co., 1909.
 “Garcilasso de la Vega,” by J.D.M. Ford. The Catholic Encyclopedia, Vol. 6:381-2. New York: Robert Appleton Co., 1909.
 “Giraldi, Giovanni Battista,” by J.D.M. Ford. The Catholic Encyclopedia, Vol. 6:568. New York: Robert Appleton Co., 1909
 “Giusti, Giuseppe,” by J.D.M. Ford. The Catholic Encyclopedia, Vol. 6:574. New York: Robert Appleton Co., 1909.
 “Goldoni, Carlo,” by J.D.M. Ford. The Catholic Encyclopedia, Vol. 6: 631. New York: Robert Appleton Co., 1909.
 “Gomes De Amorim, Francisco,” by J.D.M. Ford. The Catholic Encyclopedia, Vol. 6:632-3. New York: Robert Appleton Co., 1909.
 “Gonzalo de Berceo,” by J.D.M. Ford. The Catholic Encyclopedia, Vol. 6:636. New York: Robert Appleton Co., 1909.
 “Gozzi. Carlo,” by J.D.M. Ford. The Catholic Encyclopedia, Vol. 6: 688. New York: Robert Appleton Co., 1909.
 “Italian Language,” by J.D.M. Ford. The New International Encyclopedia,Vol. 11: 16-18. New York: Dodd, Mead & Co, 1909.
 “Italian Literature,” by J.D.M. Ford. The New International Encyclopedia,Vol. 11: 18-27. New York: Dodd, Mead & Co, 1909.

1910−1919

 Review of La Difinita Pleiteada, Estudio de Literatura Comparative por Menendez Pidal; by J.D.M. Ford. Romanic Review I: 4, (October –December 1910).
 “Dante Purgatorio XIII, 49ff.,” by J.D.M. Ford. NY: Romanic Review I:2, (April – June 1910), p. 208-9.
 “Guzmán, Fernando Pérez de,” by J.D.M. Ford. The Catholic Encyclopedia, Vol. 7:94. New York: Robert Appleton Co., 1910.
 “Herculano de Carvalho e Araujo, Alejandro,” by J.D.M. Ford. The Catholic Encyclopedia, Vol.7:251. New York: Robert Appleton Co., 1910.
 “Herrera, Fernando de,” by J.D.M. Ford. The Catholic Encyclopedia, Vol. 7:294-5. New York: Robert Appleton Co., 1910.
 "Iglesias de la Casa, José,” by J.D.M. Ford. The Catholic Encyclopedia, Vol. 7:639. New York: Robert Appleton Co., 1910.
 “Jáurengui, Juan de,” by J.D.M. Ford. The Catholic Encyclopedia, Vol. 8:325-6. New York: Robert Appleton Co., 1910.
 “Jovellanos, Gaspar Melchor de,” by J.D.M. Ford. The Catholic Encyclopedia, Vol. 8:529. New York: Robert Appleton Co., 1910.
 “Lope de Vega Carpio, Félix,” by J.D.M. Ford. The Catholic Encyclopedia, Vol. 9:354-5. New York: Robert Appleton Co., 1910.
 “March, Auzias,” by J.D.M. Ford. The Catholic Encyclopedia, Vol. 9642. New York: Robert Appleton Co., 1910.
 “Marenco, Carlo and Leopold,” by J.D.M. Ford. The Catholic Encyclopedia, Vol. 9:651-2. New York: Robert Appleton Co., 1910.
 “Petrarch, Francesco,” by J.D.M. Ford. The Catholic Encyclopedia, Vol. 11:778-780. New York: Robert Appleton Co., 1910.
 Old Spanish Readings, Selected on the Basis of Critically Edited Texts; edited with introduction, notes and vocabulary by J.D.M. Ford. Boston:International Modern Language Series,1911. 7 editions.
 Selections from Don Quijote, edited by J.D.M. Ford. Boston: D.C. Heath, 1911.
 “Galdós: Nobel Prize Candidate,” Boston Transcript, 11 Dec 1911.
 “Mena, Juan de,” by J.D.M. Ford. The Catholic Encyclopedia, Vol. 10:171. New York: Robert Appleton Co., 1911.
 "Menzini, Benedetto,” by J.D.M. Ford. The Catholic Encyclopedia, Vol. 10:196. New York: Robert Appleton Co., 1911.
 “Metastasio, Pietro,” by J.D.M. Ford. The Catholic Encyclopedia, Vol. 10::234. New York: Robert Appleton Co., 1911.
 "Morales, Ambrosio,” by J.D.M. Ford. The Catholic Encyclopedia, Vol. 10:556-7. New York: Robert Appleton Co., 1911.
 "Ojeda, Alonso de,” by J.D.M. Ford. The Catholic Encyclopedia, Vol. 11:230. New York: Robert Appleton Co., 1911.
 "Parini, Giuseppi,” by J.D.M. Ford. The Catholic Encyclopedia, Vol. 11:480. New York: Robert Appleton Co., 1911.
 "Pellico, Silvio,” by J.D.M. Ford. The Catholic Encyclopedia, Vol. 11:609. New York: Robert Appleton Co., 1911.
 “Pindemonte, Ippolito,” by J.D.M. Ford. The Catholic Encyclopedia, Vol. 12:101. New York: Robert Appleton Co., 1911.
 "Porta, Carlo,” by J.D.M. Ford. The Catholic Encyclopedia, Vol. 12:283. New York: Robert Appleton Co., 1911
 "Pulci, Luigi,” by J.D.M. Ford. The Catholic Encyclopedia, Vol. 12:562. New York: Robert Appleton Co., 1911.
 "Redi, Francesco,” by J.D.M. Ford. The Catholic Encyclopedia, Vol. 12:687. New York: Robert Appleton Co., 1911.
 "Rodrigues Ferreira, Alexandre,” by J.D.M. Ford. The Catholic Encyclopedia, Vol. 13:109. New York: Robert Appleton Co., 1912.
 "Selgas y Carrasco, José,” by J.D.M. Ford. The Catholic Encyclopedia, Vol. 13:691-2. New York: Robert Appleton Co., 1912.
 “Tassoni, Alessandro,” by J.D.M. Ford. The Catholic Encyclopedia, Vol. 14:464. New York: Robert Appleton Co., 1912.
 "Tebaldeo, Antonio,” by J.D.M. Ford. The Catholic Encyclopedia, Vol. 14:468. New York: Robert Appleton Co., 1912.
 “Tiraboschi, Girolamo,” by J.D.M. Ford. The Catholic Encyclopedia, Vol. 14:738. New York: Robert Appleton Co., 1909.
 "Trissino, Giangiorgio,” by J.D.M. Ford. The Catholic Encyclopedia, Vol. 15:61. New York: Robert Appleton Company, 1912.
 "Trueba, Antonio de,” by J.D.M. Ford. The Catholic Encyclopedia, Vol. 15: 70. New York: Robert Appleton Co., 1912.
 “Verdaguer, Jacinto,” by J.D.M. Ford. The Catholic Encyclopedia, Vol.15. New York: Robert Appleton Co., 1912.
 "Vicente, Gil,” by J.D.M. Ford. The Catholic Encyclopedia, Vol.15. New York: Robert Appleton Co., 1912.
 “Spain,” by J.D.M. Ford. The Catholic Encyclopedia, Vol. 14: 169-202. New York: Robert Appleton Co., 1912.
 “Spanish-American Literature,” by J.D.M. Ford. The Catholic Encyclopedia, Vol. 14:202-7. New York: Robert Appleton Co., 1912.
 “Spanish Language and Literature,” by J.D.M. Ford. The Catholic Encyclopedia, Vol. 14:192-202. New York: Robert Appleton Co., 1912.
 “Diplomacy Below the Equator,” by J.D.M. Ford. Boston Transcript, August 12, 1913.
 “Possible Foreign Sources of the Spanish Novel of Roguery,” by J.D.M. Ford. Anniversary Papers by Colleagues and Pupils of George Lyman Kittredge. Boston: Ginn and Co., 1913, pp. 289–293.
 "Cervantes,” by J.D.M. Ford. Lectures on the Harvard Classics, Ed. William Allan Neilson, et al. Vol 51: 238-42. The Harvard Classics. New York: P.F. Collier & Son, 1909–14.
 "Manzoni,” by J.D.M. Ford. Lectures on the Harvard Classics, Ed. William Allan Neilson, et al. Vol 51: 243-7. The Harvard Classics. New York: P.F. Collier & Son, 1909–14.
 A Spanish Grammar with Alternative Exercises; by E.C. Hills and J.D.M. Ford. Boston: D.C. Heath & Co., 1915.
 First Spanish Course; by E.C. Hills and J.D.M. Ford. Boston: D.C. Heath & Co., 1917. 10 editions.
 “El Sombrero de Tres Picos (The Cocked Hat),” by J.D.M. Ford. The Encyclopedia Americana. XII: 46-7. New York: Encyclopedia Americana, 1918.
 “Fábulas of Tomás de Iriarte,” by J.D.M. Ford. The Encyclopedia Americana. XII: 696-7. New York: Encyclopedia Americana, 1918.
 Spanish Fables in Verse, edited with introductions and vocabulary by Elizabeth C. and J.D.M. Ford. Boston: Heath's Modern Language Series, 1918.
 “The Teaching of Spanish and our Spanish-American Interests,” Abstract of report made by J.D.M. Ford to the American Association of University Professors and to the Modern Language Association of America. Studies in Philology XV, 1 (January, 1918), p. 65-67.
 “Guzmán el Bueno,” by J.D.M. Ford. The Encyclopedia Americana. XIII: 585-6. New York: Encyclopedia Americana, 1919.
 “José” by J.D.M. Ford. The Encyclopedia Americana. XVI: 210-11. New York: Encyclopedia Americana, 1919.
 “La Barraca” by J.D.M. Ford. The Encyclopedia Americana. XVI: 567. New York: Encyclopedia Americana, 1919.
 “La Victoria de Junín” by J.D.M. Ford. The Encyclopedia Americana. XVI: 585-6. New York: Encyclopedia American, 1919.
 Main Currents in Spanish Literature; by J.D.M. Ford. New York: Henry Holt & Co., 1919. 8 editions.

1920−1929

 “Spanish Language” by J.D.M. Ford. The Encyclopedia Americana. XXV: 349-351. New York: Encyclopedia Americana, 1920.
 “Spanish Literature” by J.D.M. Ford. The Encyclopedia Americana. XXV: 353-8. New York: Encyclopedia Americana, 1920.
 “Hispanic America,” a lecture by J.D.M. Ford in New Lecture Hall, March 26, in aid of the Endowment Fund for Radcliffe College, Harvard Alumni Bulletin, 10 May 1923, pp. 909–920.
 “Some Consideration on Diphthongs and Triphthongs,” by J.D.M. Ford. Homenajea Menendez Pidal II. Madrid: Revista de la Universidad de Madrid, 1924, pp. 29–33.
 A Portuguese Grammar, by E.C.Hills, J.D.M. Ford, and Joaquim de Siquiera Coutinho. Boston: Heath's Modern Language Series, 1925. 6 editions.
 Review of CH. Petit-Dutaillis, ed., Fragmentde l’Histoire de Philippe-Auguste, Roy de France: Chronique en Français des Années 1214–1216; by J.D.M. Ford. Bibliothèque del’École des Chartres LXXXVII, 1926. Reprinted in Speculum (1926), pp. 353–354.
 Review of William J. Entwistle, The Arthurian Legend in the History of the Spanish Peninsula, by J.D.M. Ford, Bulletin of Hispanic Studies III (1926), pp. 141–2.
 Review of T. Atkinson Jenkins, La Chanson de Roland, Oxford Version, Edition, Notes and Glossary, by J.D.M.Ford, Speculum II: 1 (Jan 1927), pp. 92–104.
 “The Passage of Vulgar Latin Close Ų to French Rounded I (Ü, Y) is Purely a Romance Phenomenon,” by J.D.M. Ford. Extrait des Mèlanges de Philologie et d'histoire offerts à M. Antoine Thomas. Paris: Librairie Ancienne Honoré Champion, 1927.
 El Capitán Veneno, por D. PedroAntonio de Alcarón, edited with notes, exercises and vocabulary by J.D.M.Ford and Guillermo Rivera. Boston: Heath's Modern Language Series, 1927. 102 editions.
 “Plot, Tale and Episode in Don Quixote”; by J.D.M. Ford. Extraitdes Mélanges de linguistique et de literature offerts à M. Alfred Jeanroy parses élèves et ses amis. Paris: E. Droz. 1928.
 A Spanish Grammar for Colleges; by E.C. Hills and J.D.M.Ford. Boston: Heath's Modern Language Series, 1928.

1930−39

 A Tentative Bibliography of Brazilian Belles-Lettres; by J.D.M. Ford, Arthur P. Whitten and Maxwell L. Raphael. Cambridge: Harvard Univ. Press,1931. (Harvard Council of Hispano-American Studies VI.)
 Letters of John III, King of Portugal, 1521–1557. The Portuguese text, edited with an introduction by J.D.M. Ford. Cambridge: Harvard Univ. Press, 1931.
 Cervantes:  A Tentative Bibliography of his Works and of the Biographical Material concerning him; by J.D.M. Ford and Ruth Lansing. Cambridge: Harvard Univ. Press, 1931. 3 editions.
 “The Saints Life in the Vernacular Literature of the Middle Ages”, by J.D.M. Ford. Catholic Historical Review, XVII: 3, reprinted October 1931.
 Letters of the Court of John III,King of Portugal. The Portuguese text, edited with an introduction by J.D.M. Ford. Cambridge: Harvard Univ. Press, 1933. 3 editions.
 A Bibliography of Cuban Belles-Lettres; by J.D.M. Ford & Maxwell I. Raphael. Cambridge: Harvard Univ. Press, 1933. (Harvard Council of Hispano-American Studies) 2 editions.
 A Tentative Bibliography of Paraguayan Belles-Lettres; by Maxwell L. Raphael & J.D.M. Ford. Cambridge: Harvard Univ. Press, 1934. (Harvard Council of Hispano-American Studies)
 “In Memoriam Henry Roseman Lang,” by J.D.M. Ford. Hispanic Review, III (1935), p. 70.
 “Sheldon, Edward Stevens,” by J.D.M. Ford. Dictionary of American Biography, XVII, pp. 64–65.
 “Ticknor, George,” by J.D.M. Ford, Dictionary of American Biography, XVIII, pp. 525–528.
 Crónica de Dom João de Castro; edited with an introduction by J.D.M. Ford. Cambridge:  Harvard Univ. Press,1936.  2 editions.
 “The Ciceronian Dictum of History,”by J.D.M. Ford, Catholic Historical Review, XXI, 4, reprint 1936.
 “Harvard and La France,” by J.D.M. Ford, Harvard Alumni Bulletin, October 23, 1936.
 Brief Spanish Grammar for Colleges; by E.C. Hills, J.D.M. Ford and G. Rivera. Boston: Heath's Modern Language Series, 1938. 2 editions.
 “The First English Translator of the Lusíadas of Camões,Sir Richard Fanshawe,” by J.D.M. Ford. Modern Humanities Research Association, XVII (Sep 1938), pp. 6–23. (Reprinted in Harvard Alumni Bulletin, September 19, 1938)
 Review of Rodney Gallop, Portugal – A Book of Folkways, by J.D.M. Ford. Journal of American Folk-Lore, Vol. 51,No. 199 (Jan-Mar 1938), pp. 115–7.
 Bibliografí critic de ediciones del Quijote, impresas desde 1605 hasta 1917, recompiladas y descrites Juan Suñé Benages y Juan Suñé Fonbuena; continudas hasta 1937 por el primero de loscitados sutores y ahora redaciada por J.D.M. Ford y C.T. Keller. Cambridge: Harvard Univ. Press, 1939. (A Critical Bibliography of Editions of The Don Quixote Printed Between 1605 and 1917 by Benages and Fonbuena, continued to 1937 by....). 2 editions.

1940−1950

 The Lusiad, translated by SirRichard Fanshawe, edited with introduction by J.D.M. Ford. Cambridge: Harvard Univ. Press, 1940.
 “Some Principles of Linguistic Change in Romance,” by J.D.M.Ford. Speculum, Vol. 15, No 3 (Jul 1940), 384-5.
 New First Spanish Course, by E C Hills, J D M Ford. London: George G. Harrap, 1942. 4 editions.
 Portuguese Grammar; by Elijah Clarence Hills; J D M Ford; John de S Coutinho; revised by LG Moffat. Boston: Heath's Modern Language Series, 1944.
 “Hills, E. C.,” by J.D.M. Ford. Dictionary of American Biography, XXI, 405-6.
 “Lang, Henry,” by J.D.M. Ford. Dictionary of American Biography, XXI, 481-2.
 Os Lusíadas by Luis de Camões; edited with introduction and notes by J.D.M. Ford. Harvard Studies in Romance Languages XXIII. Cambridge: Harvard Univ. Press, 1946.  9 editions.
 “In Memoriam of Henry Lang,” by J.D.M. Ford. Hispanic Review I (1946), p. 70.
 “The Significance of the Cervantes Quadricentennial,” by J.D.M. Ford. Hispania, (Aug 1947), pp. 293–96.
 “George Ticknor,” by J. D. M.Ford. Hispania, Vol. 32, No. 4, (Nov1949), pp. 423–425.
 Review of La Política y la Reconquista en el Siglo XI (by RamónMenéndez Pidal), by J.D.M. Ford. Speculum, Vol. 24, No. 1 (Jan., 1949), pp. 132–133.
 “The Saint’s Life in the Middle Ages,” by J. D. M. Ford. The Catholic Historical Review, 17: 3(Oct 1931), pp. 268–9.

Other

 Classic Italian Poetry; edited by J. D. M. Ford. In press in winter 1903–1904.
 “The Novel,” by J. D. M. Ford.
 The Types of English Literature, Neilson, William Allen, ed., Boston: Houghton Mifflin Co., contracted 1907.

Articles to which he contributed

 Les Annales du Midi.
 România literară.
 Modern Philology.
 Publications of the Modern Language Association of America (PMLA)
 Modern Language Notes
 Romanic Review

Spanish and Italian article contributions

 The Catholic Encyclopedia
 The Dictionary of American Biography
 The Encyclopedia Americana
 Johnson's Encyclopedia
 The New International Encyclopedia
 The Universal Cyclopaedia

References

Further reading
 Annual Report of the Dante Society (Cambridge, MA: The Athenæum Press, annual).
 Bulletin - American Council of Learned Societies (New York, NY: American Council of Learned Societies).
 Bulletin of the American Association of University Professors, VIII: 1 (Jan 1922) (Cambridge, MA: AAUP, 1922).
 Intellect (New York:  Society for the Advancement of Education).
 Italica: Bulletin of the American Association of Teachers of Italian (Menasha, WI: G. Banta Publ. Co., 1924).
 Massachusetts City Directories (Provo, UT: The Generations Network, Inc., 2005).
 The Boston Herald (Boston, MA: 1846 on.) 
 The Cambridge Annual (Boston, MA: Geo. F. Crook, annually).
 The Catholic Historical Review (Baltimore, MD: Catholic Univ. of America Press, 1937).
 The Harvard Crimson (Cambridge, MA: 1873-).
 The Journal of the American Folk-Lore Society (Lancaster, PA: Press of the New Era Printing Co.)
 The New York Times.
 The Romanic Review (New York: Columbia Univ. Press).
 Blue Book of Cambridge 1905 (Cambridge, MA: Advertiser Pub. Co., 1905).
 Ford Bible.
 Liste des Membres de la Société des Anciens Textes Français et Provençaux (Paris, France: E. Champion, 1926).
 The Catholic Encyclopedia: An International Work of Reference on the Constitution, Doctrine, Discipline, and History of the Catholic Church (New York, NY: The Encyclopedia Press, Inc., 1907–1914).
 The Encyclopedia Americana (New York, The Encyclopedia Americana Corp., 1919).
 American Academy of Arts & Sciences, Proceedings of the American Academy of Arts & Sciences (Boston, MA: American Academy of Arts & Sciences).
 American Association of Teachers of Spanish and Portuguese.
 American Association of University Professors, List of Charter Members of the American Association of University Professors (New York, NY: May 1915).
 Boucher, François, American Footprints in Paris (New York, NY: Charles H. Doran, 1921).
 Brace, A.M, Americans in France: A Directory (American Chamber of Commerce in France, 1926).
 Brandeis, Louis Dembitz, Letters of Louis D. Brandeis (New York:  SUNY Press, 1971).
 The Cambridge Tribune (Cambridge, MA: Tribune Publ. Co., 1876–1966).
 Carnegie Institute, Carnegie Endowment for International Peace, Year Book, 1922, No. 11 (Washington, D.C.: The Endowment, 1922).
 Curtis, Georgina Pell & Elder, Benedict, The American Catholic Who's Who (NC News Service. 1943).
 Doyle, Henry Grattan, "Jeremiah Denis Mathias Ford" (Cambridge, MA: The Modern Language Journal, Vol. 43, No. 2 (Feb 1959), pp. 59–61).
 Doyle, Henry Grattan, "Jeremiah Denis Mathias Ford" (Walled Lake, MI:  Hispania, Vol. 19, No. 2 (May 1936), pp. 153–162).
 Doyle, Henry Grattan, "The Work of the Harvard Council on Hispano-American Studies" (Cambridge, MA: The Modern Language Journal, Vol. 20, No. 6 (Mar, 1936), p. 367-370).
 Doyle, Henry Grattan, "What Others Say--: J.D.M. Ford Receives Laetare Medal" (Cambridge, MA: The Modern Language Journal, Vol. 21, No. 2 (May, 1937), p. 619-623).
 "A Great Teacher Retires" (Walled Lake, MI: Hispania, Vol. 26, No. 3 (Oct 1943), pp. 320–321).
 Handschin, Charles Hart, The Facilities for Graduate Instruction in Modern Languages in the United States (Oxford, OH: Miami Univ.Publ., 1914).
 Harvard University, The Harvard Graduates Magazine (Boston, MA: Harvard Graduates Magazine Assn., 1898-).
 Harvard University, The Harvard University Gazette (Cambridge, MA: Harvard University)
 Harvard University, Alumni Directory of the Harvard Law School (Cambridge, MA: Harvard Univ. Press).
 Harvard University, Harvard Alumni Bulletin XXIV (Boston, MA: Harvard Bulletin, Inc., 1922).
 Harvard University, Harvard Alumni Directory (Cambridge, MA: Harvard Univ. Press, annual).
 Harvard University, Harvard College, Class of 1894, Twenty-fifth Anniversary Report: 1849–1919 (Norwood, MA: Plimpton Press, 1919).
 Harvard University, Harvard University Catalogue (Cambridge, MA: Harvard Univ. Press, annual).
 Harvard University, Harvard University Directory (Cambridge, MA: Harvard Univ. Press, annual).
 Harvard University, Historical Register of Harvard University: 1636–1936 (Cambridge, MA:  Harvard Univ. Press, 1937).
 Harvard University, Names and Addresses of Living Bachelors and Masters of Arts, and of the Holders of Honorary Degrees of Harvard University ...: 1895, 1904, 1905 (Cambridge, MA: Harvard Univ. Press, 1902, 1905, 1908, 1909, 1910).
 Harvard University, Official Register of Harvard University (Cambridge, MA: Harvard Univ. Press).
 Harvard University, Quinquennial Catalogue of the Law School of Harvard University: 1817–1899 (Cambridge, MA: The Law School, 1900).
 Harvard University, Reports of the President and the Treasurer of Harvard College (Cambridge, MA: Harvard Univ. Press).
 Holmes, Urban T., Jr., & Denomy, Alex J., eds., Mediaeval Studies in Honor of Jeremiah Denis Mathias Ford (Cambridge, MA: Harvard Univ. Press, 1948).
 Holmes, Urban T., Jr., Miller, Charles, R.D., & Whiting, Bartlett Jere, "Jeremiah Denis Mathias Ford in Memoirs of Fellows and Corresponding Fellows of the Mediaeval Academy of America" (Cambridge, MA: Speculum, Vol. 34, No. 3 (Jul, 1959), pp. 531–532.)
 Lanman, Charles Rockwell, Letters, 1916–1937.
 Marquis, Albert Nelson and Leonard, John William, Who's Who In America (Albert Nelson Marquis & Marquis Who's Who Inc.)
 Marquis, Albert Nelson, Who's Who in New England: A Biographical Dictionary of Leading Living Men and Women of the States of Maine, New Hampshire, Vermont, Massachusetts, Rhode Island and Connecticut (Chicago, IL: A.N. Marquis & Co., various).
 Medieval Academy of America, Speculum:  A Journal of Medieval Studies (Cambridge, MA:  Medieval Academy of America, 1926 on).
 Morison, Samuel Eliot, Three Centuries of Harvard, 1636–1936 (Cambridge, MA:  Harvard Univ. Press., 1936).
 Motter, H.L., ed., Who's Who in the World, 1912 (New York, NY: Intl. Who's Who Publ. Co.)
 National University of Ireland, Calendar for the Year (Maynooth, Ireland: National Univ. of Ireland, 1975).
 Place, Edwin B, "Jeremiah Denis Mathias Ford (1873–1958)" (Philadelphia, PA: Hispanic Review, Vol. 28, No. 1 (Jan 1960), pp. 94–6).
 "Religion: Laetare Sunday" (Time Magazine, 15 March 1937).
 Roosevelt, Franklin Delano & Elliott, F.D.R.: His Personal Letters, Early Years (New York:  Duell, Sloan & Pearce, 1947).
 Salmons, Catherine A, "Literary Landmark: Let's Save the Last Touchstone of Anne Bradstreet" (Boston, MA: bostonphoenix.com, Apr 1997).
 Shand-Tucci, Douglass; Rudenstine, N.L; Cheek, Richard, Harvard University: An Architectural Tour (Princeton, NJ: Princeton Architectural Press, 2001).
 Shilton, Katherine, "This Scholarly Colored Alumna: Anne Julia Cooper's Troubled Relationship with Oberlin College" (Oberlin, OH: Electronic Oberlin Group, People, 2003).
 University of Notre Dame.
 Ware, Edith Ellen, The Study of International Relations in the United States: Survey for 1937 (New York: for The American National Committee on International Intellectual Cooperation by Columbia Univ., Press, 1938).

1873 births
1958 deaths
American book editors
American book publishers (people)
American education writers
Linguists from the United States
Harvard College alumni
Harvard University faculty
Writers from Cambridge, Massachusetts
Laetare Medal recipients
Contributors to the Catholic Encyclopedia
Harvard Graduate School of Arts and Sciences alumni